The 2010–11 Nationalliga A was the 41st edition of the premier category of the Swiss women's football national championship, organized by the Swiss Football Association. It took place from 7 August 2010 to 28 May 2011. Ten teams took part in the competition, with FC Saint Gallen replacing relegated Rapperswil Jona. It marked a reform in the competition system, with the introduction of a second stage comprising an eight-teams round-robin championship play-off and a promotion confronting the first stage's two bottom teams and the Nationalliga B's two top teams.

YB Frauen won its tenth title ten years later with an 18–6–1 record, qualifying for the 2011-12 Champions League. FC Yverdon Féminin was the runner-up tied at points with Basel, while defending champion FC Zürich was fourth. 2007 champion FFC Zuchwil and Rot-Schwarz Thun were relegated. YB Frauen's Veronica Maglia was the championship's top scorer with 16 goals.

First stage

Final stage

Championship round

Promotion

Top scorers

References

2010-11
Swiss
2010–11 in Swiss football